Ambodiadabo is a town and commune in Madagascar. It belongs to the district of Mandritsara, which is a part of Sofia Region. The population of the commune was estimated to be approximately 6,000 in the 2001 commune census.

Only primary schooling is available. The majority 95% of the population of the commune are farmers.  The most important crop is rice, while other important products are wheat, maize, cassava and barley.  Services provide employment for 5% of the population.

References and notes 

Populated places in Sofia Region